Bari (also Romanized as Bārī and Bary; also known as Bāre and Bāreh) is a village in Anzal-e Shomali Rural District, Anzal District, Urmia County, West Azerbaijan Province, Iran. At the 2006 census, its population was 168, in 53 families.

References 

Populated places in Urmia County